USS K-2 (SS-33) was a K-class submarine, of the United States Navy.  Her keel was laid down by Fore River Shipbuilding Company in Quincy, Massachusetts, as Cachalot, making her the first ship of the United States Navy to be named for the cachalot, another name for the sperm whale, but on 17 November 1911, during construction, she was renamed K-2. She was launched on 4 October 1913 sponsored by Mrs. Ruth Chamberlain McEntee, and commissioned on 31 January 1914.

Service history
After trials and exercises in New England waters throughout the spring and summer of 1914, K-2 joined 4th Division, Atlantic Torpedo Flotilla, Newport, Rhode Island, on 9 October. She commenced operations immediately and for almost three years operated along the East Coast from New England to Florida conducting experiments to develop the techniques of submarine warfare.

The batteries to the submarine failed just two months after the sea trial and Rear Admiral William Nelson Little was court-martialed for accepting the submarine, even after problems with the batteries were recognized.

As World War I raged in Europe, guarding the vital shipping lanes across the Atlantic Ocean became imperative. K-2 departed New London, Connecticut, on 12 October 1917 and arrived in the Azores for patrol duty on 27 October. She was among the first U.S. submarines to engage in patrol duty during the war, and cruised in these waters searching for enemy U-boats. K-2 continued these vital patrols until 20 October 1918 when she sailed for North America arriving Philadelphia, Pennsylvania, on 10 November to resume coastal operations.

From 1919 to 1923, she cruised along the East Coast engaging in submarine development experiments.  After her arrival at Hampton Roads on 15 November 1922, K-2 remained there until she decommissioned 9 March 1923. She was sold as scrap 3 June 1931.

Notes

References

External links
 

United States K-class submarines
World War I submarines of the United States
Ships built in Quincy, Massachusetts
1913 ships